The term Dororo may mean:

 Dororo, an anime/manga from the 1960s
 Dororo (1969 TV series), the 1969 anime series based on the manga
 Dororo (2019 TV series), the 2019 anime series based on the manga
 Dororo (film), live action film based on the manga
 "Dororo/Kaihōku", theme song for 2019 anime series Dororo by Asian Kung-Fu Generation
 Lance Corporal Dororo, a ninja from the anime/manga series Sgt. Frog